Domestic technology is the incorporation of applied science into the home. There are multiple aspects of domestic technology. On one level, there are home appliances, home automation and other devices commonly used in the home, such as clothes dryers and washing machines.

On another level, domestic technology recognizes the use of applied science to construct homes to achieve a particular goal, such as energy efficiency or self-sufficiency.  For more information, read about self-sufficient homes. It has been claimed that domestic technology has led to decreases in the time people spend on household work, although the factual basis of this claim is disputed.

Types of domestic technology 

Many technologies are now routinely used around the home. For example, microwave ovens and washing machines, among others.

Cleaning equipment 

 Broom
 Mop
 Sink
 Shower
 Bath
 Vacuum cleaner
 Dishwasher
 Washing machine
 Clothes dryer
 Hair dryer

Electric lighting 

 Fluorescent light bulb
 Incandescent light bulb
 LED light bulb

Cooking appliances 

 Barbecue
 Bread maker
 Blender
 Coffee machine
 Faucet
 Food processor
 Microwave oven
 Mixer
 Oven
 Rotimatic

Food storage and preservation 

 Food storage container
 Canning
 Refrigerator

Home maintenance 

 Groundskeeping equipment
 Garden tools
 Paint sprayer

Air conditioning 
 Air conditioner
 Central heating unit
 Fan

Computer systems 

 Data storage device
 Personal computer
 Telephone
 Video game console

 Knitting machine
 Plumbing
 Home router

Power generation 

 Solar panels
 Wind Turbines

Home security 

 Surveillance cameras
 Alarm systems
 Electronic locks

Home automation 

In the 21st century, especially by the 2010s, home automation has increasingly been introduced into the modern household, colloquially referred to as smart home technology.

While the technology was already in development in the 1990s, only in the next two decades was Local Area Networking ubiquitous in the home, thanks to the introduction of computer networking.

Since modern home networks often make use of wireless networking (e.g. Wi-Fi), modern automation can easily be set up without having to run wires through the building. Alternatively, they can be connected to wired networks.

Types of home automation 

 Smart home appliances
 Automatic vacuum cleaners and other Domestic robots
 Smart locks
 Smart speakers, with voice controlled digital personal assistants.

Concerns towards home automation 

Unlike older forms of domestic technology, smart appliances are Internet-facing, and there have been many concerns that cyberattacks may be conducted on insecure home appliances. A kind of attack is to deploy malware on smart home appliances known as botnets, which can be controlled by a remote attacker.

See also 
 Air quality
 Food safety
 Home automation
 Major appliance
 Water quality

References

Further reading 
 Cowan, Ruth Schwartz. More Work for Mother: The Ironies of Household Technology from the Open Hearth to the Microwave (Basic Books, 1983) .
 Habib, Laurence. Computers and the Family: A Study of Technology in the Domestic Sphere. PhD Thesis, London, UK: London School of Economics and Political Sciences (LSE) 2000 (PDF file).
 Siddiqui, Shakeel, and Darach Turley (2006). "Media technologies: Mediated families" In: Gavan Fitzsimons and Vicki Morwitz ed. Advances in Consumer Research, Vol. 34, Association for Consumer Research: Orlando.

External links 
 ICS 97.040.30 Domestic refrigerating appliances 

Domestic implements
Home
Home economics
Technology-related lists